Heinz Weitzendorf (born 4 May 1931) is a German composer and conductor.

Life 
Born in Altenweddingen, Weitzendorf first went to the preliminary studies department  in Halle. He then studied choral conducting at the Hochschule für Musik "Hanns Eisler". He also studied composition with Wolfgang Hohensee in Berlin. He composed mainly wind and vocal music.

Awards 
 1977: Patriotic Order of Merit in Bronze.
 1981: Hanns Eisler Prize
 1981: Kunstpreis of the National People's Army
 1984: Vaterländischer Verdienstorden

Work 
 Ja, Häuser baun. Zum Fundamente legen (1965)
 Die Ballade vom Soldaten John (1966)
 Die Welt muß sich drehn (1968)
 Bei den Funkern (1972)
 Sinfonischer Revolutionsmarsch

Further reading 
 Sabine Mecking, Yvonne Wasserloos (ed.): Musik – Macht – Staat: Kulturelle, soziale und politische Wandlungsprozesse in der Moderne. V&R unipress, Göttingen 2012, .

References

External links 
 
 

German conductors (music)
20th-century German composers
20th-century classical composers
Recipients of the Patriotic Order of Merit in bronze
1931 births
Living people
People from Börde (district)